Rostellariella is a genus of sea snails, marine gastropod mollusks in the family Rostellariidae within the Stromboidea, the true conchs and their allies.

Species
Species within the genus Rostellariella include:

Rostellariella barbieri Morrison, 2008
Rostellariella delicatula (Nevill, 1881) - Synonym of Tibia delicatula Nevill, 1881
Rostellariella lorenzi Morrison, 2005
Rostellariella martinii (Marrat, 1877)

References

  Liverani V. (2014) The superfamily Stromboidea. Addenda and corrigenda. In: G.T. Poppe, K. Groh & C. Renker (eds), A conchological iconography. pp. 1–54, pls 131-164. Harxheim: Conchbooks.

External links

Strombidae
Monotypic gastropod genera